Roshan is an Afghan telecommunications provider, serving over six million active subscribers.

History

In January 2003, Roshan was awarded the second GSM license in Afghanistan, at a time when there was only one other mobile phone operator, Afghan Wireless in the country. Decades of civil wars had left a limited telecommunications infrastructure. Prior to the fall of the Taliban, phone lines were not accessible to the population, and Afghans had to travel abroad to make international calls.

Roshan, which means "light" or "hope" in Persian, is one of Afghanistan's leading telecommunications providers. Today, Roshan's GSM network reaches 240 cities and towns across all of Afghanistan's 34 provinces.  The network covers over 91% of the population, including the most remote rural areas.

Roshan is one of the largest investors, private companies and taxpayers in Afghanistan. It has invested nearly $600 million in the telecommunications infrastructure in Afghanistan. Roshan is also continuing to expand its network in areas where there is no or limited cellular coverage.

Roshan employs over 1,100 people, of whom 20% are women. Indirectly, the company has added over 30,000 jobs to the Afghan economy through its top-up stations, retail stores and public call offices.

Roshan introduced 3G in April 2013.  It was the third company in the market to have been granted a 3G license after Etisalat (UAE-based telecom), and MTN (South Africa-based telecom), waiting to ensure it could deliver the highest quality service.  It has 3G service in Kabul, Jalalabad, Kandahar, Mazar, Herat, and Kunduz.

In October 2017, a cooperation with the Wikimedia Foundation that had already begun on September 29, 2017, was announced, which was intended to provide customers with free access to Wikipedia and its sister projects, so no data volume would be charged for connections for this purpose. The cooperation was part of the Wikipedia Zero project, which was discontinued by the Wikimedia Foundation in February 2018. Accordingly, the existing agreement with Roshan expired on December 15, 2018, without renewal.

Shareholders
Roshan was originally founded under the ownership of the following companies:
 51,00 % - Aga Khan Fund for Economic Development (AKFED) - Part of Aga Khan Development Network
 35,00 % – Monaco Telecom International (MTI), subsidiary of NJJ Capital (55% - since 2014, acquired from Cable & Wireless) and Principality of Monaco over Société Nationale de Financement (45%)
 9,00 % - MCT Corporation (former U.S. company involved in joint ventures in the telecommunications sector in Russia and Central Asia - now part of TeliaSonera)
 5,00 % - Alcatel

The investments are held through the Telecom Development Company of Afghanistan B.V., based in Amsterdam, which holds 100% of the shares of the Telecom Development Company of Afghanistan Ltd..

In July 2004, Alcatel fully sold its 5% stake with 3.25% in MCT and 1.75% in MTI.
The investments are held through the Telecom Development Company of Afghanistan B.V., based in Amsterdam, which holds 100% of the shares of the Telecom Development Company of Afghanistan Ltd.

As of July 31, 2020, TeliaSonera sold its 12.25%  and Monaco Telecom sold its 36.75% stake each to AKFED in August 2020, making it the sole owner.

Competition
Roshan is the largest telecom provider in Afghanistan.  Major competitors include Etisalat, MTN and Afghan Wireless.

M-Paisa
In 2008, Roshan introduced the M-Paisa money transfer service, which enables registered Roshan customers to transfer money using their mobile phone for peer-to peer transfer, repayment of microfinance loans, purchase of airtime and salary disbursement for companies. Roshan partnered with Vodafone to launch this service and M-Paisa now operates on a Comviva platform.

See also
List of Afghan companies
Telecom Development Company Afghanistan

References

External links

 
 The Economist: Shining a Light
 Hisham, Hishamuddin (11/3/2007)1500 Public Call Office to Be Established in Rural Areas of Afghanistan, Anis Newspaper
 (6/21/2007) Roshan And Cisco To Take Telemedicine To Afghanistan, Wireless Healthcare
 (7/25/2005) Org Infomatics
 BBC Monitoring World Media. (2/26/2008) Afghanistan: Mobile-phone money-transfer service launched.
 Xinhua General News Service. (3/2/2008) Armed men destroy mobile phone tower in S. Afghanistan.
 Reuters. (9/25/2008) Afghan wireless industry plagued by security issues. The Globe and Mail (Canada), Pg. B11.
 Anneli Groenewald. (10/1/2008) CSR and the environment: Developing countries: Social working.  TT Magazine.
 Thai Press Reports. (8/14/2008) Afghanistan:  ADB supports expansion of mobile phone services in Afghanistan.

Telecommunications companies of Afghanistan
Mobile phone companies of Afghanistan
Aga Khan Development Network